The 1938 World Men's Handball Championship was the first ever handball World Championship. It was played in Germany on 5 and 6 February 1938.
Contested by just 4 national teams, the tournament was won by hosts Germany.

Venues
All games were played in the Deutschlandhalle in Berlin. The court had the dimensions 50 × 25 meter (today 40 × 20 meter).

Squads

Referees
One referee from Denmark and two from Germany were refereeing the games.

Results

Top scorers

Medallist Squads

City tournament 
Besides the World Men's Handball Championship there was also a city tournament played. Berlin won the city tournament.

References
 International Handball Federation 
 Games of Sweden
 Games of Germany (Helmut Laaß and Stephan Müller)

World Handball Championship tournaments
H
1938 in German sport
International handball competitions hosted by Germany
February 1938 sports events